ArenaBowl XXIX was the championship game of the 2016 Arena Football League season. It was played between the American Conference Champion Philadelphia Soul and the National Conference Champion Arizona Rattlers. The game was played at Gila River Arena in Glendale, Arizona.

This was the Arizona Rattlers' tenth ArenaBowl appearance and the Philadelphia Soul's fourth appearance. It was the Soul's second ArenaBowl victory.

Venue
The game was played at Gila River Arena in Glendale, Arizona due to the Rattlers' usual home arena of Talking Stick Resort Arena being the site of a WNBA game between the Phoenix Mercury and Dallas Wings on the same day.

Television
This was the third consecutive ArenaBowl televised on ESPN.

Background
The Philadelphia Soul finished the regular season with a 13–3 record and the number one seed in the American Conference. The Soul then beat the Tampa Bay Storm in the American Conference Semifinals and the Jacksonville Sharks in the American Conference Championship. The Arizona Rattlers finished the regular season with a 13–3 record and the number one seed in the National Conference. The Rattlers then beat the Portland Steel in the National Conference Semifinals and the Cleveland Gladiators in the National Conference Championship.

Box score

Source:

References

029
2016 Arena Football League season
Philadelphia Soul
Arizona Rattlers
2016 in sports in Arizona
Events in Glendale, Arizona
August 2016 sports events in the United States
Sports competitions in Maricopa County, Arizona
Sports in Glendale, Arizona